This is a list of people executed in Connecticut, prior to the abolition of capital punishment in the state on April 25, 2012.

List

Notes:

 On this occasion, two executions took place.
 On this occasion, three executions took place.
 This is what the chart claimed in 2005, but contrary to popular belief, Adonijah Bailey was not the oldest person executed at age 79 in 1824; instead, he was tried and sentenced to death at age 80 in January 1825 for the murder of Jeremiah W. Pollock, and hanged himself on May 24, over 2 weeks before he was to be executed. The title of the oldest person executed goes instead to Gershon Marx, hanged on May 18, 1905, for murder at age 73.
 James Savage, ed., John Winthrop, The History of New England from 1630 to 1649, Vol. 2, (Boston:Little, Brown, 1853), page 324. See also Goodheart, where there are 158 death penalty victims identified for Connecticut.
 Posthumously pardoned.

Summary

See also 
 Capital punishment in Connecticut
 Capital punishment in the United States
 List of counties in Connecticut
 Methods of execution: Electrocution, Hanging, Lethal injection
 Ocuish, Hannah
 Ross, Michael Bruce
 Taborsky, Joseph "Mad Dog"
 Young, Achsah

References

External links 
 Death Penalty News from Mail-Archive.com
 Connecticut Executions from 1894 to 2005

 
Connecticut
Executed